Jacqueline Joyner-Kersee (born March 3, 1962) is a retired American track and field athlete, ranked among the all-time greatest athletes in the heptathlon as well as long jump. She won three gold, one silver, and two bronze Olympic medals in those two events at four different Olympic Games. Sports Illustrated for Women magazine voted Joyner-Kersee the Greatest Female Athlete of All-Time. She is on the board of directors for USA Track & Field (U.S.A.T.F.), the national governing body of the sport.

Joyner-Kersee is an active philanthropist in children's education, racial equality and women's rights. She is a founder of the Jackie Joyner-Kersee Foundation, which encourages young people in East St. Louis to pursue athletics and academics. She collaborated with Comcast to create the Internet Essentials program in 2011, which provides high-speed internet access to low-income Americans.

Joyner-Kersee is one of the most famous athletes to have overcome severe asthma. In March 2023, she was inducted into the International Sports Hall of Fame.

Early life
Jacqueline Joyner was born March 3, 1962, in East St. Louis, Illinois, and was named after Jacqueline Kennedy, the First Lady of the United States. As a high school athlete at East St. Louis Lincoln Senior High School, she qualified for the finals in the long jump at the 1980 Olympic Trials, finishing 8th behind another high schooler, Carol Lewis.  She was inspired to compete in multi-disciplinary track & field events after seeing a movie about Babe Didrikson Zaharias. Didrikson, the track star, basketball player, and pro golfer, was chosen the "Greatest Female Athlete of the First Half of the 20th Century. Fifteen years later, Sports Illustrated for Women magazine voted Joyner-Kersee the greatest female athlete of all time, just ahead of Zaharias.

UCLA
Jackie Joyner attended college at the University of California, Los Angeles (UCLA) where she starred in both track & field and in women's basketball from 1980–1985. She was a starter in her forward position for each of her first three seasons (1980–81, 81–82, and 82–83) as well as in her senior (fifth) year, 1984–1985. She had red-shirted during the 1983–1984 academic year to concentrate on the heptathlon for the 1984 Summer Olympics.

She won the Broderick Award, (now the Honda Sports Award) as the nation's best female collegiate track and field competitor in 1983 and in 1985, and was awarded the Honda-Broderick Cup, given to the nation's best female collegiate athlete in 1985.

She scored 1,167 points during her collegiate career, which places her 19th all time for the Bruins games. The Bruins advanced to the West Regional semi-finals of the 1985 NCAA Women's Division I Basketball Tournament before losing to eventual runner-up Georgia.

She was honored on February 21, 1998 as one of the 15 greatest players in UCLA women's basketball. In April 2001, Joyner-Kersee was voted the "Top Woman Collegiate Athlete of the Past 25 Years." The vote was conducted among the 976 NCAA member schools.

UCLA statistics
Source

Competition

1984 Summer Olympics
Joyner competed in the 1984 Summer Olympics in Los Angeles and won the silver medal in the heptathlon. She was the favorite heading into the event, but finished five points behind Australian Glynis Nunn. She also placed fifth in the long jump.

1986 Goodwill Games
Joyner was the first woman to score over 7,000 points in a heptathlon event (during the 1986 Goodwill Games). In 1986, she received the James E. Sullivan Award as the top amateur athlete in the United States.

1988 Summer Olympics
Now known as Jackie Joyner-Kersee after marrying her coach Bob Kersee, she entered the 1988 Summer Olympics in Seoul, Korea and earned gold medals in both the heptathlon and the long jump. At the Games, she set the still-standing heptathlon world record of 7,291 points. The silver and bronze medalists were Sabine John and Anke Vater-Behmer, both of whom were representing East Germany. She was the first American woman to earn a gold medal in long jump as well as the first American woman to earn a gold medal in heptathlon.

At the Games she faced unfounded allegations of drug use by the men's 800m 1984 Olympic gold medalist and 1988 Olympic silver medalist Joaquim Cruz. This continued the following season in 1989 when Darrell Robinson accused her coach, Bobby Kersee, of distributing performance-enhancing drugs.

1991 World Championships

Joyner-Kersee was everyone's favorite to retain both her World titles earned four years earlier in Rome. However, her challenge was dramatically halted when, having won the long jump easily with a  jump no one would beat, she slipped on the take-off board and careened headfirst into the pit, avoiding serious injury. She did, however, strain a hamstring, which led to her having to pull out of the heptathlon during the 200 m at the end of the first day.

1992 Summer Olympics

In the 1992 Summer Olympics in Barcelona, Spain, Joyner-Kersee earned her second Olympic gold medal in the heptathlon.  She also won the bronze medal in the long jump which was won by her friend Heike Drechsler of Germany.

1996 Summer Olympics

At the Olympic Trials, Joyner-Kersee sustained an injury to her right hamstring. When the 1996 Summer Olympics in Atlanta, Georgia began, Joyner-Kersee was not fully recovered by the time the heptathlon started. After running the first event, the 100 m hurdles, the pain was unbearable and she withdrew. She was able to recover well enough to compete in the long jump and qualify for the final, but was in sixth place in the final with one jump remaining. The Atlanta Olympics was the last Olympics of Joyner-Kersee's long competitive career.

Professional basketball career

In 1996 Joyner-Kersee signed on to play pro basketball for the Richmond Rage of the fledgling American Basketball League. Although she was very popular with the fans, she was less successful on the court. She appeared in only 17 games, and scored no more than 15 points in any game.

1998 Goodwill Games
Returning to track, Joyner-Kersee won the heptathlon at the 1998 Goodwill Games, scoring 6,502 points.

2000 Olympic trials

Two years after retiring, Joyner-Kersee tried to qualify for the long jump event at the 2000 Olympics in Sydney, Australia. She placed sixth at 21–10 ¾.

Awards and honors

1983 Broderick Award (now Honda Sports Award)
1985 Broderick Award (now Honda Sports Award)
1986 James E. Sullivan Award
 1986 Jesse Owens Award
 1987 Jesse Owens Award
 1997 Jack Kelly Fair Play Award
 2000 St. Louis Walk of Fame inductee
 2005 was inducted as a Laureate of The Lincoln Academy of Illinois and awarded the Order of Lincoln (the State's highest honor) by the Governor of Illinois in the area of Sports
2010 NCAA Silver Anniversary Awards honoree
 2011 Dick Enberg Award, College Sports Information Director of America (CoSIDA)

Since 1981, the Jesse Owens Award is given by USATF (and before its renaming, TAC) the United States' track and field "athlete of the year."  In 1996, the award was split to be given to the top athlete of each gender.  In 2013, the Female award was renamed the Jackie Joyner-Kersee Award.

Current world records
, Joyner-Kersee holds the world record in heptathlon along with the top six all-time best results whilst her long jump record of 7.49 m is second on the long jump all-time list. In addition to heptathlon and long jump, she was a world class athlete in 100 m hurdles and 200 meters being  in top 60 all time in those events.

Sports Illustrated voted her the greatest female athlete of the 20th century.

Joyner-Kersee has consistently maintained that she has competed throughout her career without performance-enhancing drugs.

Personal bests 

Personal bests 
 100 metres hurdles : 12.61 s
 Long jump : 7.49 m (still currently #2 all time, 3 cm behind the world record and she did it twice)
 High jump : 1.93 m
 200 m : 22.30 s
 Shot put : 16.84 m
 Javelin throw : 50.12 m
 800 m : 2 min 8.51 s

TV appearances
In 2000, Kersee played herself in an episode of The Jersey called "Legacy" where Nick Lighter (played by Michael Galeota) uses a magical jersey by jumping into her body as he is coached by her husband (played by Bob Kersee) on how to put the shot for a track and field competition.

Personal life
Jackie's brother is the Olympic champion triple jumper Al Joyner, who was married to Olympic track champion Florence Griffith Joyner. Jackie married her track coach, Bob Kersee, in 1986.

In 1988, Joyner-Kersee established the Jackie Joyner-Kersee Foundation, which provides youth, adults, and families with athletic, academic lessons and the resources to improve their quality of life with special attention directed to East St. Louis, Illinois. In 2007, Jackie Joyner-Kersee along with Andre Agassi, Muhammad Ali, Lance Armstrong, Warrick Dunn, Mia Hamm, Jeff Gordon, Tony Hawk, Andrea Jaeger, Mario Lemieux, Alonzo Mourning, and Cal Ripken Jr. founded Athletes for Hope, a charitable organization that helps professional athletes get involved in charitable causes and inspires millions of non-athletes to volunteer and support the community.

References

External links

 
 
 
 
 
 The Jackie Joyner Kersee Foundation, which helps children and adults in the East St. Louis, IL/St. Louis, MO area

1962 births
Living people
Sportspeople from East St. Louis, Illinois
Track and field athletes from Illinois
American women's basketball players
American heptathletes
American female long jumpers
African-American female track and field athletes
Olympic gold medalists for the United States in track and field
Olympic silver medalists for the United States in track and field
Olympic bronze medalists for the United States in track and field
Athletes (track and field) at the 1984 Summer Olympics
Athletes (track and field) at the 1988 Summer Olympics
Athletes (track and field) at the 1992 Summer Olympics
Athletes (track and field) at the 1996 Summer Olympics
Pan American Games gold medalists for the United States
Pan American Games medalists in athletics (track and field)
Athletes (track and field) at the 1987 Pan American Games
World Athletics Championships athletes for the United States
World Athletics Championships medalists
World Athletics record holders
World record setters in athletics (track and field)
Richmond Rage players
UCLA Bruins women's track and field athletes
UCLA Bruins women's basketball players
James E. Sullivan Award recipients
Medalists at the 1996 Summer Olympics
Medalists at the 1992 Summer Olympics
Medalists at the 1988 Summer Olympics
Medalists at the 1984 Summer Olympics
Goodwill Games medalists in athletics
Track & Field News Athlete of the Year winners
World Athletics Championships winners
Competitors at the 1998 Goodwill Games
Competitors at the 1986 Goodwill Games
Competitors at the 1990 Goodwill Games
Competitors at the 1994 Goodwill Games
Medalists at the 1987 Pan American Games
21st-century African-American people
21st-century African-American women
20th-century African-American sportspeople
20th-century African-American women
20th-century African-American people